After the Fall of Man (Finnish: Jälkeen syntiinlankeemuksen) is a 1953 Finnish drama film directed by Edvin Laine and starring Martti Katajisto, Eila Peitsalo and Edvin Laine.

Cast
 Martti Katajisto as Klaus Toivola  
 Eila Peitsalo as Anja  
 Edvin Laine as Maisteri Kahari  
 Helena Vinkka as Elsa Tuovi  
 Matti Aulos as Ranta - factor  
 Kaarlo Halttunen as Harjula  
 Alli Häjänen as Anni Järvinen  
 Eino Kaipainen as Opettaja  
 Marjatta Kallio as Koululainen  
 Martta Kinnunen as Siivooja  
 Martta Kontula as Opettaja 
 Aarne Laine as Rector  
 Matti Ranin as Aarne  
 Emma Väänänen as Klausin äiti 
 Pentti Irjala as Onnenpyörän hoitaja  
 Heikki Savolainen as Janitor

References

Bibliography 
 Tad Bentley Hammer. International film prizes: an encyclopedia. Garland, 1991.

External links 
 

1953 films
1953 drama films
Finnish drama films
1950s Finnish-language films
Films directed by Edvin Laine
Finnish black-and-white films